Georgy Georgevich Totibadze (in , born on  in Tbilisi), also known as Gogi Totibadze, is a Russian and Georgian painter and illustrator.

Personal situation

Early life 
Georgy Totibadze was born in Tbilisi on ,. His father, Georgy Konstantinovich Totibadze was a painter and was the rector of the Tbilisi State Academy of Arts, which bears to this day the name of his grandfather, Apollon Kutateladze.

He spent the first years of his life with his parents, his brother Konstantin and his sister Maria in Tbilisi, at 11 Zandukeli Street (formerly Djavakhishvili Street).

Since his childhood, Gogi creates historical battlefield paintings, inspired from extracts of the Greek mythology.

Family 
Georgy Totibadze marries Irina Savelievna Kozlova, also a painter. Their children are Nana, Manana and Varvara Totibadze.

His brother Konstantin as well as his uncles, Guram Apollonovich Kutateladze and Karaman Apollonovich Totibadze are painters. His nephew Anton Totibadze is a painter, illustrator and designer and Gogi's sister, Maria Totibadze, is a fashion stylist and his niece, Musia Totibadze, is a singer and actress.

Biography

Art

Education 
When moving in Moscow, Georgy Totibadze shared his grandfather Apollon Kutateladze's workshop with the rest of his mother's family, until 1983. His neighbours were Alexander Tyshler, symbolist illustrator and painter, and Dmitry Ivanovich Khamin, who became Gogi's first painting and drawing personal teacher.

Whilst he studies, he meets his future wife Irina Savelievna Kozlova, painter and illustrator. Georgy obtains his diploma in 1986. He enters the Tbilisi State Academy of Arts with art teacher Georgy Aleksi-Meskhishvili, followed by Georgy's own father, Georgy Konstantinovich Totibadze. Georgy Georgevich stayed in his father's workshop from 1986 to 1991.

Career 
From 1993 until 1994, Georgy Totibadze lives and works in Paris, where his painting style becomes more lyric. He creates a series of portraits during this period.

Georgy Totibadze created a series of paintings in Hong Kong, later bought by members of the Japanese diaspora in 1996.

From 1997 to 1998, he moves to San Francisco, where he mostly created a series of paintings of landscapes.

From 2000 onwards, the painter mostly compose aerial views of urban and rural landscapes.

Since 2007, Georgy Totibadze works and produces artworks in his workshop in the Strelka Institute.

On 26 January 2016, Georgy and Konstantin Totibadze inaugurated and opened the Totibadze Art gallery in the Moscow Contemporary Art Center Winzavod with Marina Tsurtsumia (Russian screenwriter and Film maker) and Georgi Tasker., Since, the gallery has been exhibiting the works of several artists such as Alena Kirtsova, Olga and Alexander Florenski, Alexander Zakharov, Ruben Monakhov, Sergey Zuev , Muriel Rousseau and Andrey Sarabianov.

Georgy Totibadze has proposed a project for the Moscow Biennale in 2017.

Georgy participates to charity actions to raise funds for orphanages in 2008, to help young rough sleepers in Moscow in 2009 as part of the SAMU Social in Moscow, and has given some of his works to be sold to help flood victims in Georgia in 2015.

Karate 
Aged 11, Georgy Totibadze begins to practise Shitō-ryū.

His teachers were Eydlin, Mabuni Kenei and Hidetoshi Nakahashi. He wins 5 silver medals at the Russia Championships, one silver medal at the Japan championships and two bronze medals at the world Shitō-ryū championships. His fondness for Asiatic cultures is reflected in his works.

Exhibitions

Public collections 
Georgy Totibadze's works are exhibited at several art galleries of which the Totibadze gallery, the Moscow Museum of Modern Art and the State Museum of Oriental Art.

Filmography 
He has been part of the cast for the film Russia 88 by Pavel Bardin.

See also

Bibliography

External links 

 
 Auction selling of Totibadze's works at Phillips
 Auction selling of Totibadze's works at Sotheby's
 Auction selling of Totibadze's works at Christie's

References 

1967 births
Painters from Georgia (country)
Tbilisi State Academy of Arts alumni
Living people